Jamshed Patel (18 April 1914 – 13 October 1987) was an Indian cricket umpire. He stood in nine Test matches between 1948 and 1958.

See also
 List of Test cricket umpires

References

1914 births
1987 deaths
Cricketers from Mumbai
Indian Test cricket umpires